James Swan may refer to:

Musicians
 Jimmy Swan (1912–1995), American country musician
 Jimmy Barnes (born 1956), singer-songwriter whose real name is James Swan

Politicians
 James Swan (mayor of Brisbane) (1811–1891)
 James C. Swan (born 1958), United Nations Secretary-General's Special Representative for Somalia
 James D. Swan (1903–1977), vegetable farmer from Wisconsin who served two terms as a state senator

Others
 Dr. James "Jim" S. Swan (1941-2017), whisky expert
James Swan (boxer) (born 1974), boxer from Australia
 James Swan (financier) (1754–1830), Bostonian merchant
 James G. Swan (1818–1900), Indian agent
 James A. Swan, American writer, TV and film producer, and actor

See also
 James Swann (born 1964), American serial killer
 James Swann (weightlifter), New Zealand weightlifter